Samuel Aranda (born 1979) is a Spanish photojournalist. He won World Press Photo of the Year 2012.

Early life
Aranda was born in Santa Coloma de Gramenet, Spain.

Career 
Aranda began to work as a photographer for newspapers El País and El Periódico de Catalunya at the age of 19. Two years later he traveled to the Middle East, where he covered the Israeli–Palestinian conflict for the Spanish news agency EFE.

In 2004 Aranda begun working for Agence France-Presse (AFP), covering stories in Europe, Asia, the Middle East and Africa. The photojournalist association ANIGP-TV awarded Arandas' photo series, about African immigrants trying to reach Europe, with the Spanish National Award of Photography. Since 2006 he has worked as a freelance photojournalist.

In 2011 Aranda covered the Arab Spring in Tunisia, Egypt, Libya and Yemen. In 2012 he was awarded the World Press Photo of the Year 2011. His winning picture shows a woman embracing her son, wounded during clashes against the rule of President Ali Abdullah Saleh in Sana'a, Yemen, part of the Arab Spring.

References

External links 
 

Spanish photographers
People from Santa Coloma de Gramenet
1979 births
Living people